White Cloud Peak 9, also known as WCP 9, at  above sea level is an unofficially named peak in the White Cloud Mountains of Idaho. There are many signature peaks in the White Cloud Mountains that are very obscure and rarely visited. Cirque Lake is directly southeast of the peak, and Slide Lake is directly northeast of the peak.

References 

Mountains of Custer County, Idaho
Mountains of Idaho
Sawtooth National Forest